Ludwik Kubala (9 September 1838 in Kamienica - 30 September 1918 in Lwów) was a Polish historian. Lived in Kraków and Lwów, fought in the January Uprising. In 1880-1881 he published a historical treaty that is said to have inspired Henryk Sienkiewicz to create The Trilogy. In addition to historical works, he wrote poems, plays and edited newspapers. He was also a gymnasium teacher.

External links
 Piotr Czartoryski-Sziler  Ludwik Kubala - wybitny polski historyk (Ludwik Kubala - great Polish historian)

1838 births
1918 deaths
19th-century Polish historians
Polish male non-fiction writers
People from Limanowa County
Burials at Lychakiv Cemetery
January Uprising participants
Recipients of the Order of Franz Joseph
Polish educators
Historians of Poland